Kuwait College of Science and Technology (KCST) is a private university in Kuwait. KCST is located in Doha District, west of Kuwait City. KCST started its degree programs in 2016. Its operations are regulated by the Private Universities Council (PUC) of Kuwait.

The university campus is in Doha District, Al Asimah Governorate, near the border with Al Jahra Governorate, and the former Camp Doha. It is owned by The Company of Science and Technology for Higher Education (COSTHE). Laboratory facilities include physics labs, electronics and instrumentation labs, and computing labs.

References 

Universities and colleges in Kuwait
Educational institutions established in 2016
2016 establishments in Kuwait